Enrico Boniforti (7 December 1917 in Saronno – 18 October 1991 in Saronno) was an Italian professional football player.

His older brother Arturo Boniforti also played football professionally.

1917 births
1991 deaths
Italian footballers
Serie A players
Serie B players
S.S.D. Varese Calcio players
A.C. Milan players
U.S. Cremonese players
Palermo F.C. players
Juventus F.C. players
S.S.D. Lucchese 1905 players
Association football defenders